Jonathan Tamimi Syberg (born 12 October 1994) is a professional footballer who plays as a right-back for IK Brage. Born in Sweden, he represents Jordan internationally.

International career
Tamimi debuted for the Jordan national football team in a friendly 1–1 tie with Libya on 25 December 2017.

Honours

Club
Hammarby IF
 Superettan (1): 2014

Jönköpings Södra
 Superettan (1): 2015

References

External links
 
 

1994 births
Living people
Association football fullbacks
Jordanian footballers
Swedish footballers
Allsvenskan players
Superettan players
Hammarby Fotboll players
Jönköpings Södra IF players
GIF Sundsvall players
Mjällby AIF players
Degerfors IF players
IK Brage players
Sweden youth international footballers
Jordan international footballers
Swedish people of Jordanian descent
Jordanian people of Swedish descent